Philip Shaibu (born 1 December 1969, in Kaduna) an alumnus of University of Jos is a Nigerian politician. He is currently the Deputy Governor of Edo State, Nigeria.

Personal life and education

Early childhood
Shaibu was born in Kaduna to a Christian family. His father was late Pastor Francis Osikpomobo Shaibu and his mother was Lucy Momoh. He was raised with strong Christian virtue.

Education
He had his early education at St. Augustine Primary School, Tundu Wada Kaduna but finished at L.E.A Primary School Barnawa, Kaduna State where he obtained the First School Leaving Certifiate, Shaibu subsequently earned his West African Senior School Certificate in 1989 after attending Saudana Memorial Secondary School, Kawo Kaduna.
Comrade Shaibu received a Bachelor of Science degree (Honours) in Accounting from the University of Jos in 2000, where he was the President of the National Association of Nigerian Students (NANS) between 2000 and 2001 and a master of Business Administration (MBA) from University Of Benin in 2015.

Family life
He is married to Mrs. Maryann Philip-Shaibu and has children.

Private career
After he left school he started working with the Nigerian Prisons Service, Abuja but voluntarily retired as an Assistant Inspector of Prisons in 2002 so he can venture into full politics.

Political career
Philip Shaibu first ventured into politics in 2003 when he contested elections into the Edo State House of Assembly under the platform of the All Nigeria Peoples Party (ANPP) but lost..

Shaibu once again in 2007 contested and won the election to represent the good people of Etsako West Constituency under the platform of the Action Congress (AC) at the Edo State House of Assembly. While he was at Edo State House of Assembly, he was elected as the majority leader on 24 February 2010 after Rt. Hon. Zakawanu Garuba was impeached as the Speaker of the Edo state House of Assembly.

In 2015, after spending eight years at the Edo state House of Assembly, he contested and won the Etsako Federal constituency House of Representatives seat to beat his closest rival with a poll of 42,079 votes against Abbas Braimah of the Peoples Democratic party who polled 29,941 votes to clinch the representative seat.

He was unanimously announced as the running mate to governor Godwin Obaseki at the last 2016 Edo State gubernatorial election and the duo eventually won the election and was sworn in on 12 November 2016

On 16 June 2020, Shaibu resigned his membership from the All Progressives Congress

References 

1969 births
Living people
Nigerian Roman Catholics
University of Jos alumni
People from Edo State
Nigerian political candidates
Deputy Governors of Edo State
University of Benin (Nigeria) alumni
All Progressives Congress politicians